Iowa Public Radio is a state network in the U.S. state of Iowa that combines the operations of the National Public Radio member stations run by Iowa State University, the University of Iowa, and University of Northern Iowa. They broadcast programs from National Public Radio, Public Radio International and American Public Media,  along with local content (notably music) on weekends and evenings.

The network is headquartered in Des Moines, with studios on the ISU campus in Ames, the University of Iowa campus in Iowa City and the UNI campus in Cedar Falls.

History 

For many years, Iowa's three state universities each operated their own set of radio stations, each with slightly different program offerings and coverage areas. The three universities competed somewhat as each station sought to expand its coverage area. In late 2004, the Iowa Board of Regents, which governs the three universities, voted to merge the three radio operations, to consolidate operations. The first network to launch was a "News and Information" service in January 2007, followed by a Classical service in September 2007. Nighttime adult alternative music programming that had already aired on several stations, such as "Night Music" and KUNI's "Live from Studio One", was expanded into a third full service called "Studio One". This matches the network structures maintained by Minnesota Public Radio and Wisconsin Public Radio, which also break their stations off into different networks.

Iowa Public Radio includes WOI and WOI-FM at Iowa State University, WSUI and KSUI at the University of Iowa, and KUNI and KHKE at the University of Northern Iowa. The operations have combined revenues of about $7 million annually and about 60 employees.

Since IPR came into existence decades after FM became popular, the dial was already full in most areas, limiting the potential for new stations and leading to inconsistent coverage. Some cities can receive several IPR stations, while areas of western and southern Iowa can only receive grade B coverage from one of the network's two AM stations during the daytime. This has resulted in ten of IPR's fifteen fully licensed stations carrying a mix of services.

Since its debut, the IPR network has made it a priority to expand its services in western and southern Iowa. Pending applications for new stations would add service in western Iowa, although other organizations are also competing for those frequencies. In addition, eight construction permits have already been issued for new stations, many of which will add coverage in southern Iowa.  On March 21, 2008, KUNZ in Ottumwa became the IPR network's first new station to begin broadcasting.  IPR has since signed on a second Ottumwa station.

In 2008, IPR shut down the individual station Web sites, all of which now redirect to iowapublicradio.org.

Board of directors

Iowa Public Radio is governed by a board of directors consisting of one appointee of the president of each of the Regents' universities and two community representatives appointed by the Board of Regents.

Member Stations 
Iowa Public Radio programs three different services. All three AM stations in the network carry the News Network. Affiliated FM stations carry one of two services. The News & Studio One Network programs news/talk programming from 5 a.m. to 7 p.m. and Studio One adult alternative music from 7 p.m. - 5 a.m. The Classical Network airs classical music 24 hours a day.

New Station Applications 

During a filing window for new stations in the non-commercial portion of the band (88-92 MHz) in October 2007, the Universities that make up Iowa Public Radio applied for new stations in Atlantic, Keokuk, Mason City, Rockwell City, Shenandoah, Sioux City, and Storm Lake. However, all of these applications are in competition with other groups.

References

External links 
Iowa Public Radio
2004 report recommending the formation of Iowa Public Radio

NPR member networks

Iowa State University
University of Iowa
University of Northern Iowa
2004 establishments in Iowa